The following are the winners of the 6th annual ENnie Awards, held in 2006:

References

External links
 2006 ENnie Awards

 
ENnies winners